Ellie Kawamura (born November 27, 1993) is an American ladies' figure skater. She is the 2009 U.S. junior national silver medalist and qualified once for the ISU Junior Grand Prix Final.

Career
Kawamura's parents introduced her to skating at age four, considering it good exercise and balance training.

She won the junior silver medal at the 2009 U.S. Championships. Kawamura was then sent to the 2009 International Challenge Cup in The Hague, Netherlands where she won silver on the junior level.

Kawamura made her ISU Junior Grand Prix debut in the following season. She was assigned to a JGP event in Hungary, where she placed 4th, and then to a second event in Croatia, where she won the bronze. This qualified her for the JGP Final in Tokyo, Japan where she placed 8th.

Programs

Competitive highlights

References

External links 
 

Living people
1993 births
American female single skaters
People from Monterey Park, California
21st-century American women